"My Love" is a song by Spanish singer/songwriter Julio Iglesias, featuring American musician Stevie Wonder. It was released as a single in 1988 from Iglesias' album, Non Stop. The duet was a top 5 hit in the UK and Ireland, reaching numbers 5 and 2, respectively. In the U.S., it reached No. 80 on the Billboard Hot 100, and No. 14 on the Adult Contemporary chart.

Track listings
7-inch

 "My Love" (featuring Stevie Wonder) – 4:58
 "Words and Music" – 4:34

7-inch EP & CD single

 "My Love" (featuring Stevie Wonder) – 4:58
 "Words and Music" – 4:34
 "To All the Girls I've Loved Before" (featuring Willie Nelson) – 3:30
 "All of You" (featuring Diana Ross) – 3:57

12-inch

 "My Love" (featuring Stevie Wonder) – 4:58
 "Words and Music" – 4:34
 "Begin the Beguine (Volver a Empezar)" – 4:45
 "Hey!" – 3:50

Charts

References

1988 songs
1988 singles
Male vocal duets
Julio Iglesias songs
Stevie Wonder songs
Pop ballads
Songs written by Stevie Wonder
CBS Records singles
Song recordings produced by Stevie Wonder